Greasy is a census-designated place (CDP) in Adair County, Oklahoma, United States. The population was 372 at the 2010 census.

Geography
Greasy is located at  (35.678115, -94.721152).

Demographics

As of the census of 2000, there were 387 people, 133 households, and 109 families residing in the CDP. The population density was 19.0 people per square mile (7.3/km2). There were 146 housing units at an average density of 7.2/sq mi (2.8/km2). The racial makeup of the CDP was 57.11% Native American, 36.43% White, 0.78% from other races, and 5.68% from two or more races. Hispanic or Latino of any race were 3.10% of the population.

There were 133 households, out of which 33.1% had children under the age of 18 living with them, 60.9% were married couples living together, 13.5% had a female householder with no husband present, and 18.0% were non-families. 16.5% of all households were made up of individuals, and 7.5% had someone living alone who was 65 years of age or older. The average household size was 2.91 and the average family size was 3.22.

In the CDP, the population was spread out, with 26.4% under the age of 18, 10.9% from 18 to 24, 24.3% from 25 to 44, 26.1% from 45 to 64, and 12.4% who were 65 years of age or older. The median age was 35 years. For every 100 females, there were 105.9 males. For every 100 females age 18 and over, there were 105.0 males.

The median income for a household in the CDP was $23,750, and the median income for a family was $27,143. Males had a median income of $19,167 versus $17,375 for females. The per capita income for the CDP was $10,988. About 18.8% of families and 17.3% of the population were below the poverty line, including 14.7% of those under age 18 and 42.0% of those age 65 or over.

Immersion school
In November 2021, the Greasy School was sold to a Cherokee language immersion school with its first campus in Tahlequah, Oklahoma.  With Greasy situated in the largest area of Cherokee speakers in the world, the opportunity for this second campus is for students to spend the day in an immersion school and then return to a Cherokee-speaking home.

References

Census-designated places in Adair County, Oklahoma
Census-designated places in Oklahoma
Cherokee towns in Oklahoma